Mladen Bratić (6 June 1933 – 2 November 1991) was a major general in the Yugoslav People's Army (JNA).

A Bosnian Serb, Bratić was killed in the Battle of Vukovar when his tank was hit by a Croatian National Guard shell, but the JNA's advantage in artillery and rockets enabled it to halt the Croatian advance and inflict heavy casualties. The battle ended up resulting in a Yugoslav/Serbian pyrrhic victory.

References

External links
Memorial site with info

1933 births
1991 deaths
People from Nevesinje
Serbs of Bosnia and Herzegovina
Serbian generals
Generals of the Yugoslav People's Army
Military personnel of the Croatian War of Independence
Military personnel killed in the Croatian War of Independence
Yugoslav military personnel killed in action
Burials at Belgrade New Cemetery